The Czech National Time Trial Championships were created in 2000.

Men

Women

References

National road cycling championships
Cycle races in the Czech Republic
Recurring sporting events established in 2000
2000 establishments in the Czech Republic
Time Trial